Chislett is a surname. Notable people with the surname include:

Anne Chislett (born 1942), Canadian playwright
Ethan Chislett (born 1998), South African-born footballer in England
Frederick George Chislett (born c1880), Canadian athlete and entrepreneur
Laura Chislett, Australian flute player
Michael Guy Chislett (born 1982), Australian musician and producer